Susan Kuklin (born 1941) is an American photographer and award-winning writer.

Kuklin was born and raised in Philadelphia, Pennsylvania, then studied theater at New York University and the Herbert Berghof School. After graduate school at NYU, Kuklin began studying photography. Her nonfiction works frequently cover controversial topics (e.g., AIDS, poverty, and transgender youth), and often blend photography with writing.

Selected texts

Dance! (1998) 
Dance!, written with Bill T. Jones, was published September 15, 1998 by Hyperion Books for Children. The book was nominated for the Charlotte Zolotow Award for Highly Commended Title.

Iqbal Masih and the Crusaders Against Child Slavery (1998) 
Iqbal Masih and the Crusaders Against Child Slavery was published October 15, 1998 by Henry Holt and Co. and received the Flora Stieglitz Straus Award the same year.

No Choirboy (2008) 
No Choirboy: Murder, Violence, and Teenagers on Death Row was published August 5, 2008 by Henry Holt and Co. The book received the following accolades:

 American Library Association's (ALA) Quick Picks for Reluctant Young Adult Readers (2009)
 ALA Best Books for Young Adults (2009)
 Rhode Island Teen Book Award Nominee (2011)
 Florida Teens Read Nominee (2010)
 James Cook Book Award Nominee (2009)

Beyond Magenta (2014) 

Beyond Magenta: Transgender Teens Speak Out was published  February 11, 2014 by Candlewick Press. The book received the following accolades:

 Kirkus Reviews Best Books of 2014
 Flora Stieglitz Straus Award (2015)
 Stonewall Book Award Nominee for Children’s and Young Adult Literature (2015)
 Young Adult Library Services Association Nonfiction Award Nominee (2015)
 Rhode Island Teen Book Award Nominee (2017)

Despite the above, the book has been the center of controversy because it was deemed anti-family; it included offensive language, homosexuality, sex education, and political and religious viewpoints; and it was unsuited for age group. Librarians also noted that they wanted to "remove [the book] from collection to ward off complaints." According to the American Library Association, it was the 27th most banned and challenged book in the United States between 2010 and 2019. Furthermore, it was one of the top ten most challenged books in 2019 (2) and 2015 (4).

Publications 

 Taking My Cat to the Vet (1988)
 Going to My Ballet Class (1989)
 Going to My Nursery School (1990)
 Going to My Gymnastics Class (1991)
 How My Family Lives in America (1992)
 Fighting Fires (1993)
 After a Suicide (1994)
 From Head to Toe (1994)
 Fireworks: The Science, the Art, and the Magic (1996)
 Dance!, with Bill T. Jones (1998)
 Iqbal Masih and the Crusaders Against Child Slavery (1998)
 The Harlem Nutcracker, with Donald Byrd (2001)
 Hoops with Swoopes, illustrated by Sheryl Swoopes (2001)
 Trial: The Inside Story (2001)
 What Do I Do Now?: Talking about Teen Pregnancy (2001)
 From Wall to Wall (2002)
 All Aboard!: A True Train Story (2003)
 Families (2006)
 No Choirboy: Murder, Violence, and Teenagers on Death Row (2008)
 Beautiful Ballerina, with Marilyn Nelson (2009)
 Beyond Magenta: Transgender Teens Speak Out (2014)
 We Are Here to Stay: Voices of Undocumented Young Adults (2019)
 In Search of Safety: Voices of Refugees (2020)

Anthology contributions 

 You Can't Say That! Writers for Young People Talk About Censorship, Free Expression, and the Stories They Have to Tell, edited by Leonard S. Marcus (2021)

References 

21st-century American non-fiction writers
American women non-fiction writers
Living people
Writers from Philadelphia
New York University alumni
1941 births
21st-century American women writers
Photographers from Philadelphia
American women photographers
21st-century American photographers
20th-century American non-fiction writers
20th-century American women writers
20th-century American photographers
20th-century American women artists
21st-century American women artists